The 1948 San Remo Grand Prix was a non-Championship Voiturette motor race held on 27 June 1948 at the Autodromo di Ospedaletti, in Sanremo, Liguria, Italy. It was the 8th race of the 1948 Grand Prix season. The race, contested over 85 laps, was won by Alberto Ascari in a Maserati 4CLT/48, starting from pole position. Luigi Villoresi finished second also in a Maserati 4CLT/48 and Clemar Bucci third, driving a Maserati 4CL 1502.

Classification

References

San Remo Grand Prix
San Remo Grand Prix
San Remo Grand Prix